Attorney General Daniel may refer to:

John Reeves Jones Daniel (1802–1868), Attorney General of North Carolina
Price Daniel (1910–1988), Attorney General of Texas

See also
Dustin McDaniel (born 1972), Attorney General of Arkansas
General Daniel (disambiguation)